Paola Jessica Bermúdez Caicedo (born 11 September 1971) is an Ecuadorian former footballer who played as a midfielder. She has been a member of the Ecuador women's national team.

Club career
Bermúdez has played for the Guayas selection in Ecuador.

International career
Bermúdez capped for Ecuador at senior level during two Copa América Femenina editions (2003 and 2006). She also integrated the squad that competed at the 2007 Pan American Games.

References

1971 births
Living people
Ecuadorian women's footballers
Women's association football midfielders
Ecuador women's international footballers
Pan American Games competitors for Ecuador
Footballers at the 2007 Pan American Games
21st-century Ecuadorian women